This is a list of programs currently and originally aired on SMNI.

Current programming
 A New Me: Story of Hope and Victory
 ACQ Classics - A Throwback Timeless messages of the Appointed Son.
 A Day in the Life of the Appointed Son - A 30-minute Activities of the Appointed Son of God.
 Caravan of Love
 Give Us This Day (2003–present) - a nightly show featuring fellowship with the Appointed Son of God, Pastor Apollo C. Quiboloy, singing and sharing of victory reports from viewers and Kingdom citizens around the world.
 Gospel of the Kingdom - a daily preaching program of Pastor Quiboloy featuring The King is Coming Tours from around the world (also aired on KCTV, KCNS, KIKU-TV, KVMD, WSKY, WJYS, Trinity Broadcasting Network and Joytv).
 Highest Praise (2003) – music videos featuring Kingdom Original Music by the Kingdom Musicians.
 Ito ang Buhay (This is Life) - a 1-hour program featuring Exclusive Interviews of Pastor Apollo.
 Kingdom Victories & Updates (formerly known as Kingdom Upclose) - recent church happenings, including the activities of Pastor Quiboloy.
 Newsline World (2006, 2011–present) (formerly Newsline) - SMNI's English late night newscast, aired live every 10pm.
 SMNI Newsblast (2016) - SMNI News Channel's primetime news program in Filipino language.
 SMNI Newsbreak (2016) - SMNI News Channel's hourly news updates in Filipino language.
 Powerline (1995–present) - a one-and-a-half-hour Filipino-language program of Pastor Quiboloy, where he discusses religious issues and answers queries.
 Quiet Moments – an hour of instrumental praise and worship combined with scenic views from the Garden of Eden Restored.
 Sounds of Worship (1997) - this program airs the live Thanksgiving and worship presentation held in Davao City and different parts of the world.
 Spotlight - a program where Pastor Quiboloy and his companions discusses religious issues and answers queries.
 The Passion of the Christ - airs during Holy Week only (also aired on TV5 for the Tagalog dubbed and censored version).

Specials
 Christmas from the Heart (2003–present) - a Christmas program produced for the benefit of the Children's Joy Foundation, whose goal is "To Feed, To Clothe, and To Send to School Millions of Children in the Philippines".
 Straight from the Heart

Original programming
 Batang Kaharian (lit. Kingdom Child) – a 30-minute religious education program for children sponsored by the Children's Joy Foundation
 Daily Light – an hour of instrumental praise and worship combined with scenic views
 Eagle's Eye - a 1-hour of the Appointed Son of God featuring The Life Story of Miracles of the Father Almighty.
 Generation K - a youth-oriented program produced in cooperation with the Keepers Club International
 I Am the Way – a 30-minute program of discussion of the Kingdom Doctrines based on the preaching of Pastor Quiboloy
 International Hour - a program that features bible studies and preachings in foreign languages, done by the Kingdom's world ambassadors
 Mindanao Karon - a one-hour Saturday morning news and commentary program, hosted by Boy B'laan, aired in the Teleradyo format, simulcasting from DXRD 711 kHz Davao City. 
 Tahanang Kaharian - a 1-hour Midweek Thanksgiving and Worship Presentation on air
 Walk with the Son – a 60-minute program that features testimonies, "victory reports" and life stories 
 Way Ahead - a 30-minute program of Dedicated to the Elders of the Almighty Father
 Just the Hits - a 30-minute program featuring Kingdom Music Videos

Sonshine Media Network International
Sonshine Media Network International